The Vaca Muerta Formation, commonly known as Vaca Muerta (Spanish for Dead Cow), is a geologic formation of Late Jurassic to Early Cretaceous age, located in the Neuquén Basin in northern Patagonia, Argentina. It is well known as the host rock for major deposits of shale oil and shale gas.

The large oil discovery in the Vaca Muerta Formation was made in 2010 by the former Repsol-YPF.
As of 2017, there were almost 500 fracking wells, one of the most fracked sites outside North America.

Geography
The Vaca Muerta Formation, commonly known as Vaca Muerta (Spanish for Dead Cow), is a geologic formation of Late Jurassic to Early Cretaceous age, located in the Neuquén Basin in northern Patagonia, Argentina.
Waste from the oil exploitation since 2011 has been deposited close to the town of Añelo, which is about 1,200km south of Buenos Aires.

Geology 

The Vaca Muerta Shale is a continuous tight oil and shale gas reservoir of Late Jurassic (Tithonian) and Early Cretaceous (Berriasian) age. Although called a shale, and with a total organic carbon content varying from 1 percent to 5 percent, the Vaca Muerta is predominately marl and consists of mature black shales, marls and lime mudstones. At the time of deposition, the Vaca Muerta was situated on the eastern margin of the Pacific Ocean.

Although the name Vaca Muerta Formation was introduced to the geological literature in 1931 by American geologist Charles E. Weaver, the highly bituminous shales in the Salado River valley in southern Mendoza were described in 1892 by Dr. Guillermo Bodenbender. German paleontologists Beherendsen and Steuer determined the Tithonian age of these shales. In several outcrop locations, the Vaca Muerta Formation has been the site of paleontological finds: the crocodylomorph Cricosaurus and possibly Geosaurus, the ichthyosaur Caypullisaurus, and the pterosaurs Herbstosaurus and Wenupteryx.

The Vaca Muerta Formation represents the most distal facies of the Lower Mendoza Mesosequence, a Tithonian–Valanginian broad shallowing-upward sedimentary cycle.
In the southern part of the Neuquén Basin the Lower Mendoza Mesosequence includes the basinal deposits of the Vaca Muerta Formation (early to middle Tithonian), which to the south-southeast change to mixed carbonate-siliciclastic nearshore deposits of the Carrin Cura Formation (lower part of the middle Tithonian) and Picún Leufú Formation (middle Tithonian – lower Berriasian), and to continental deposits of the Bajada Colorada Formation of Tithonian – Berriasian age.
In the central part of the Neuquén Basin, also known as Neuquén embayment, the Lower Mendoza Mesosequence consists of basinal deposits of the Vaca Muerta Formation (early to upper Tithonian), which to the east change to shoreface deposits of the Quintuco Formation (upper Tithonian – lower Valanginian), and to sabkha deposits of the Loma Montosa Formation (lower Valanginian), forming a mixed carbonate-siliciclastic depositional system. Westward the Vaca Muerta Formation includes slope facies (Huncal Member), and in the Chilean territory pass into shallow marine/volcanic deposits.
By contrast, in the southern Mendoza area the Lower Mendoza Mesosequence consists of aggradational and divergent sequences, with a maximum thickness of  towards the center of the basin. It includes basinal to middle carbonate ramp deposits of the Vaca Muerta Formation (early Tithonian – early Valanginian) and middle to inner ramp oyster-deposits of the Chachao Formation (early Valanginian), which form an homoclinal carbonate ramp system. Westward, undated tidal to continental mixed deposits have been recognized and correlated with the Vaca Muerta and Chachao Formations, receiving the name of Lindero de Piedra Formation.

Paleobiota

Vertebrates

Plesiosaurs

Ichthyosaurs

Pseudosuchians

Pterosaurs

Turtles

Oil and gas exploration and production timeline

2008-2013

2008-2013 

Given the natural decline in gas production and dimininishing returns from conventional exploration activity, in 2008 the Repsol-YPF executive Tomas Garcia Blanco sponsored the search for "unconventional" shale gas by:
 
1)  Configuring a team of explorationists under the leadership of Mikel Erquiaga with German Bottessi heading the team searching for gas. M di Benedetto was added to the team once the oil potential was fully identified.
2)  Assigning budget and resources to that team. 
3)  Appointing a Welshman (R Ll Lolley) as engineering advisor. 

This team screened all Argentine source rock formations and proposed Vaca Muerta as principal objective given that logistics were easier and it held greater potential. 

Target well locatíons were selected in most of the exploration and production leases. A policy of systematically testing the wells after they had been stimulated was adopted with wells in the Loma La Lata/ Loma Campana area being tied into existing production facilities. These policies accelerated the collection of quality data needed for the certificación of resource and reserve estimates. 

By March 2012 significant data was available from over 25 stimulated wells. The D-129 source rock had also started to be explored had tested positive. 

As part of the visualization the logistics required to develop the assets were investigated with the need for importation of drilling rigs and fracturing equipment being identified together with an opportunity for ín-country proppant sand production. The critical path was however identified as being the availability of heavy motor mechanics.

The Vaca Muerta Shale had long been known as a major petroleum source rock for other formations in the Neuquén Basin, which has had oil production since 1918. Wells producing from the Vaca Muerta itself are in several oil fields, including the Loma La Lata, Loma Lata Norte, and Loma Campana fields.

In July 2010 Repsol-YPF recognized the productive potential of the Vaca Muerta Shale of the Neuquén Basin, and completed Argentina's first shale gas well at the Loma La Lata field. In November 2010, the company completed a tight oil well in the Vaca Muerta Shale in the Loma Campana area. In August 2011, the first horizontal well in the Vaca Muerta was drilled and completed. By October 2012, 31 wells had been drilled and completed, and another 20 had been drilled and were awaiting completion. The drilling had extended the Vaca Muerta producing extent to an area of at least .

One problem in attracting development was Argentina's price controls on natural gas, keeping the price down to US$2.00-$2.50 per million BTU. However, the government exempted tight gas from controls, and in 2011 the Vaca Muerta gas was selling for US$4–$7. The higher gas prices attracted major oil companies, including ExxonMobil, Total S.A., and Chevron Corporation to Vaca Muerta. 

In May 2013, YPF announced that it had negotiated a joint venture in which Chevron would invest US$1.5 billion drilling 132 wells on the Loma Campana field.  Chevron's participation was complicated by efforts by the plaintiffs who obtained a judgement in Ecuador with respect to actions by Texaco in the Lago Agrio oil field to collect the judgement from Chevron's Argentine assets. On September 24, 2013, YPF announced that Dow Chemical Company subsidiary Dow Argentina had signed an agreement to drill 16 natural gas wells in the El Orejano block of the Vaca Muerta formation over a 12-month period, with Dow contributing US$120,000,000 and YPF US$68,000,000. Shell Argentina CEO Juan Jose Aranguren was quoted on December 10, 2013, as saying his company, with 4 producing wells in Vaca Muerta and 2 more drilling, would increase capital spending in Argentine shale to "about" US$500 million in 2014 from US$170 million in 2013.  Luis Sapag, of the Sapag family which has dominated Neuquén politics for half a century, was reported by Bloomberg in December 2013 as saying that the YPF-Chevron joint venture would invest as much as US$16 billion if the US$1.2 billion pilot venture was successful by March 2014, which would generate almost US$9 billion in royalties for Neuquén.

Developments in 2014 
In February 2014, Archer Ltd. announced it had an "approximately US$400 million" contract with YPF to provide "five new built drilling rigs to support YPF's development of unconventional shale resources in the Neuquén area in Argentina." On February 18 of the same year, YPF announced that it had signed an memorandum of understanding with PETRONAS, the Malaysian state oil company, on a possible investment (agreed upon in the following August; see below) in the 187 square kilometer Amarga Chica zone of the Vaca Muerta formation; YPF also indicated that its current production in Vaca Muerta was over 20,000 barrels of oil equivalent a day from over 150 fracked wells using 19 fracking drill rigs.  Helmerich & Payne disclosed on March 5, 2014, that it had contracted with YPF to deploy 10 drill rigs under five-year contracts from the United States to Argentina between the third quarter of 2014 and the first quarter of 2015 to work in the Vaca Muerta play in addition to the nine rigs Helmerich & Payne already had in the country.  On April 10, 2014, Miguel Gallucio of YPF announced that Chevron had decided to continue its partnership with YPF in the "massive development" of Vaca Muerta; the US$1.24 billion pilot program financed by Chevron and ended in March had developed 161 fracked wells in a 20 square kilometer area. The new phase would frack 170 additional wells that year with a joint investment of over US$1.6 billion, with YPF continuing as operator. The goal agreed upon for future years would be to develop an area of 395 square kilometers with over 1500 fracked wells producing over 50,000 barrels of oil and 3 million cubic meters (over 100 million cubic feet) of natural gas a day.  Chevron and YPF also agreed on a US$140,000,000, four-year exploration project to drill and analyze 7 vertical and 2 horizontal wells in a 200 square kilometer area (Narambuena) in the Chihuido de la Sierra Negra concession, to be financed by Chevron with YPF as operator.  In an interview with the Argentine newspaper La Nación published September 14, 2014, Gallucio indicated that production in the Loma Campana field had reached 31,000 barrels of oil equivalent a day.

On October 8, 2014, Argentine Industry Minister Débora Georgi reported that YPF had signed a confidential agreement in principle with Gazprom that could lead to a US$1 billion investment in gas exploration and production "in Argentina".

2015
In January 2015 YPF and Sinopec signed a memorandum of understanding for future cooperation in both conventional and unconventional petroleum development; they indicated that Sinopec Argentina Exploration and Production S.A. was already doing due diligence on exploration and development in "certain areas" of Vaca Muerta together with YPF.  In January 2015 YPF indicated that it and Chevron had invested over US$3 billion in their Loma Campana venture, which YPF described as the most important unconventional (oil) project in the world outside the United States.

In April 2015, Gallucio stated that production in the Loma Campana field had reached 44,000-45,000 barrels of oil equivalent a day.
In April 2015, YPF signed a memorandum on cooperation with Gazprom, though it had previously denied the report. As of May 2015, more than 30 oil and gas companies were active in Vaca Muerta.
In June 2015, YPF announced a new discovery in Vaca Muerta, this time in the La Ribera I block, with an initial output of 43,000 cubic meters (over 1.5 million cubic feet) of gas a day. In November 2015, YPF indicated that production from Vaca Muerta was 54,000 barrels of oil equivalent daily, with 47,000 from Loma Campana; it also indicated that Chevron had invested US$2,500,000,000 over the last two years. YPF showed production for the third quarter of 2016 at 58,200 barrels of oil equivalent daily from 522 wells, with 11 rigs working.
In September 2016, after the change of government in Argentina, YPF said that proposed new rates for gas would permit the continued development of gas in Vaca Muerta. 
As of 2017, there were almost 500 fracking wells, one of the most fracked sites outside North America.

Blocks and financing
As of 2013 Vaca Muerta was divided into different development blocks. Consortium of YPF (50%) and Chevron (50%) develops General Enrique Mosconi concession, including Loma La Lata Norte and Loma Campana fields.  Consortium of Petrobras (55%, operator) and Total S.A. (45%) develops the Rincon de Aranda concession.  The Los Toldos blocks are developed by the consortium of Americas Petrogas (45%, operator of the blocks), ExxonMobil (45%) and Gas y Petroleo del Neuquén (10%).  Consortium of Shell (65%, operator) Medanito (25%) and Gas y Petroleo del Neuquén (10%) develops Águila Mora and Sierras Blancas areas.  Consortium of Wintershall (50%, operator) and Gas y Petroleo del Neuquén (50%) develops the Aguada Federal block.   Apache Corporation was active in the Vaca Muerta in 2012–2013, but agreed to sell all its Argentine assets to YPF for US$800 million in an agreement signed February 12, 2014.
The Bandurria block was formerly a joint venture of Pan American Energy, YPF, and Wintershall; it has now been split into three blocks, with Wintershall as operator of Bandurria Norte, Pan American Energy as operator of Bandurria Centro, and YPF as operator of Bandurria Sur.  YPF indicated in July 2015 that it planned to drill 20 wells in Bandurria Sur with the goal of beginning shale oil production within three years at a cost of US$282.2 million. ExxonMobil is the operator of the Bajo del Choique and La Invernada blocks and has an 85% working interest in them, with Gas y Petroleo del Neuquén holding the remaining 15%; they announced their first discovery on the former block in May 2014, and their first discovery on the latter in the following December. YPF and the Malaysian state oil company PETRONAS signed an agreement on August 28, 2014, whereby PETRONAS would receive a 50% interest together with YPF in return for contributing US$475 million as part of a three-year, US$550 million, pilot project of development in the Amarga Chica block, with YPF as operator. 
In November 2016 YPF and PETRONAS announced that they had spent US$165 million drilling 9 wells in the initial phase of Amarga Chica development, and that they had agreed to move to a second stage where they would spend another US$192.5 million on drilling 10 horizontal wells and constructing surface facilities. The El Orejano block, which (as mentioned above) YPF and Dow Argentina agreed to develop in 2013, was producing 750,000 cubic meters of shale gas (nearly 26 1/2 million cubic feet) daily from a total of 19 wells by December 2015; Dow and YPF agreed to invest another US$500 million in 2016 on top of the US$350 million already invested, and drill 30 more wells in order to triple that output. In January 2016, Aubrey McClendon's American Energy Partners, LP, and YPF announced a preliminary agreement for the development of two more blocks, at a cost of over US$500 million in the next three years: Bajada de Añelo and the southern zone of Cerro Arena, the latter together with Pluspetrol and Gas y Petróleo del Neuquén; an affiliate of American Energy Partners would acquire up to a 50% participation in both. Also Madalena Ventures, Azabache, and Tecpetrol participate in exploration and production.
 
As of April 2022, the following banks financed operations in Vaca Muerta: Citi Bank, Credit Suisse, Deutsche Bank, Goldman Sachs,
HSBC, ING, Industrial and Commercial Bank of China (ICBC) and  Morgan Stanley. Both IBD and  World Bank have funded massive urban planning projects in Añelo city.

Human right violations and environmental impacts 
In July 2013, protests against the ratification of the YPF-Chevron US$16 billion agreement to exploit the Loma Campana concession were heavily repressed by the police.
Each oil well demands 640 water trucks, the equivalent of nine Olympic-size pools, over the lifetime of the well.
Other environmental externalities include the clash of sand mines with agriculture in the town of Dolavon, Chubut province.

In 2018, the Mapuche were suing Exxon, French company TotalEnergies and Pan American Energy for “dangerous waste” due to “deficient treatment” close to the town of Añelo as oioly sludge residue from fracking was tipped in illegal waste dumps.

See also 

 Choiyoi Group
 Los Molles Formation

References

External links 

 Vaca Muerta in the Encyclopedia of Science and Technology in Argentina

Geologic formations of Argentina
Lower Cretaceous Series of South America
Jurassic System of South America
Late Jurassic South America
Cretaceous Argentina
Jurassic Argentina
Berriasian Stage
Tithonian Stage
Source rock formations
Reservoir rock formations
Fossiliferous stratigraphic units of South America
Paleontology in Argentina
Formations
Geology of Neuquén Province
Oil fields in Argentina
Unconventional oil
YPF